The 1993 Toyota Atlantic Championship season was contested over 15 rounds. The Player's Toyota Atlantic Championship Drivers' Champion was David Empringham driving for Canaska Racing.

Races

Final driver standings (Top 12)

See also
1993 IndyCar season
1993 Indy Lights season

External links
ChampCarStats.com

Atlantic Championship 1993
Atlantic Championship seasons